Yoroihata Dam is a gravity dam located in Akita Prefecture in Japan. The dam is used for flood control and power production. The catchment area of the dam is 320.3 km2. The dam impounds about 255  ha of land when full and can store 51000 thousand cubic meters of water. The construction of the dam was started on 1951 and completed in 1957.

References

Dams in Akita Prefecture
1957 establishments in Japan